This is a list of Japanese films that were released, or are scheduled to release in 2020.

Highest-grossing films
The following is a list of the 10 highest-grossing Japanese films released at the Japanese box office during 2020.

Film releases

January – March

April – June

July – September

October – December

Delayed or postponed
Below is a list of films delayed or postponed due to the COVID-19 pandemic in Japan.

See also
 2020 in Japan
 2020 in Japanese television
 List of 2020 box office number-one films in Japan

References

External links

Film
2020
Lists of 2020 films by country or language